Spilomyia is a genus of hoverflies. Many species in the genus show Batesian mimicry of wasp models, including black and yellow patterns and modified antenna shape.

Species
Spilomyia abdominalis Shiraki, 1968
Spilomyia alcimus (Walker, 1849)
Spilomyia annulata Sack, 1910
Spilomyia bidentata Huo, 2013
Spilomyia boschmai Lucas, 1964
Spilomyia chinensis Hull, 1950
Spilomyia citima Vockeroth, 1958
Spilomyia crandalli Curran, 1951
Spilomyia curvimaculata Cheng, 2012
Spilomyia digitata (Rondani, 1865)
Spilomyia diophthalma (Linnaeus, 1758)
Spilomyia ephippium (Osten Sacken, 1875)
Spilomyia foxleei Vockeroth, 1958
Spilomyia fusca Loew, 1864
Spilomyia gigantea Shiraki, 1968
Spilomyia graciosa Violovitsh, 1985
Spilomyia gratiosa Wulp, 1888
Spilomyia gussakovskii Stackelberg, 1958
Spilomyia interrupta Williston, 1882
Spilomyia kahli Snow, 1895
Spilomyia liturata Williston, 1887
Spilomyia longicornis Loew, 1872
Spilomyia manicata (Rondani, 1865)
Spilomyia maroccana Kuznetzov, 1997
Spilomyia matsumurai Shiraki, 1968
Spilomyia maxima Sack, 1910
Spilomyia obscura Coquillett, 1902
Spilomyia panfilovi Zimina, 1952
Spilomyia permagna Stackelberg, 1958
Spilomyia pleuralis Williston, 1887
Spilomyia saltuum (Fabricius, 1794)
Spilomyia sayi (Goot, 1964)
Spilomyia scutimaculata Huo & Ren, 2006
Spilomyia sulphurea Sack, 1910
Spilomyia suzukii Matsumura, 1916
Spilomyia transcaucasica Kuznetzov, 1997
Spilomyia triangulata van Steenis, 2000
Spilomyia turkmenorum Kuznetzov, 1997
Spilomyia verae Kuznetzov, 1997
Spilomyia wirthi Thompson, 1996

References

External links
European list
Bugguide.net. Species Spilomyia sayi

Diptera of Europe
Diptera of Asia
Diptera of North America
Diptera of South America
Eristalinae
Hoverfly genera
Taxa named by Johann Wilhelm Meigen